Ann Rinaldi (August 27, 1934 – July 1, 2021) was an American young adult fiction author. She was best known for her historical fiction, including In My Father's House, The Last Silk Dress, An Acquaintance with Darkness, A Break with Charity, Numbering All The Bones and Hang a Thousand Trees with Ribbons. She wrote a total of more than forty novels, eight of which were listed as notable by the ALA. In 2000, Wolf by the Ears was listed as one of the best novels of the preceding twenty-five years, and later of the last one hundred years. She also wrote for the Dear America series.

Her career, prior to being an author, was a newspaper columnist. She continued the column, called "The Trentonian", through much of her writing career. Her first published novel, Term Paper, was written in 1979.

Publications

Books
A Ride into Morning: The Story of Tempe Wick (1991)
A Break with Charity: A Story About the Salem Witch Trials (1992)
The Fifth of March: A Story of the Boston Massacre (1993)
Finishing Becca: A Story about Peggy Shippen and Benedict Arnold (1994)
The Secret of Sarah Revere (1995)
Hang a Thousand Trees with Ribbons: The Story of Phillis Wheatley (1996)
An Acquaintance with Darkness (1997)
Cast Two Shadows: The American Revolution in the South (1998)
The Coffin Quilt: The Feud between the Hatfields and the McCoys (1999)
The Staircase (2000)
Girl in Blue (2001), 
Numbering All the Bones (2002)
Or Give Me Death: A Novel of Patrick Henry's Family (2003), 
An Unlikely Friendship: A Novel of Mary Todd Lincoln and Elizabeth Keckley (2007), 
Come Juneteenth (2007), 
The Ever-After Bird (2007), 

The Letter Writer (2008)

Dear America
My Heart Is on the Ground: The Diary of Nannie Little Rose, a Sioux Girl (1999), 
The Journal of Jasper Jonathan Pierce, a Pilgrim Boy (2000),

Quilt Trilogy
A Stitch in Time (1994), 
Broken Days (1995), 
The Blue Door (1999),

Others
Term Paper (1980), 
Promises Are for Keeping (1982), 
But in the Fall I'm Leaving (1985), 
Time Enough for Drums (1986), 
The Good Side of My Heart (1987), 
The Last Silk Dress (1988), 
Wolf by the Ears (1991), 
In My Father's House (1992), 
The Second Bend in the River (1997), 
Mine Eyes Have Seen (1997), 
Amelia's War (1999), 
The Education of Mary: A Little Miss of Color, 1832 (2000), 
Millicent's Gift (2002), 
Taking Liberty: The Story of Oney Judge, George Washington's Runaway Slave (2002), 
Numbering All the Bones (2002), 
Sarah's Ground (2004), 
Mutiny's Daughter (2004), 
Nine Days a Queen: The Short Life and Reign of Lady Jane Grey (2005), 
Brooklyn Rose (2005), 
The Color of Fire (2005), 
The Redheaded Princess (2008), 
My Vicksburg (2009)

References

External links
 
 

1934 births
2021 deaths
American historical novelists
American writers of young adult literature
Novelists from New Jersey
Writers from New York City
American women novelists
20th-century American novelists
21st-century American novelists
20th-century American women writers
21st-century American women writers
Women writers of young adult literature
Women historical novelists
Novelists from New York (state)
Writers of historical fiction set in the early modern period